WDNR (89.5 FM, "Widener's Best") was a college radio station in Chester, Pennsylvania, licensed to Widener University.  The station used to broadcast a wide variety of music and could also be listened to on the Internet via an online stream. WDNR marked its 40th anniversary in 2008.

On August 29, 2014, the FCC cancelled WDNR's license, after the university decided to no longer operate the station.

References

External links
 Official website

DNR
Widener University
Radio stations established in 1968
Defunct radio stations in the United States
Radio stations disestablished in 2014
1968 establishments in Pennsylvania
2014 disestablishments in Pennsylvania
DNR